In probability theory, the chain rule (also called the general product rule) describes how to calculate the probability of the intersection of, not necessarily independent, events or the joint distribution of random variables respectively, using conditional probabilities. The rule is notably used in the context of discrete stochastic processes and in applications, e.g. the study of Bayesian networks, which describe a probability distribution in terms of conditional probabilities.

Chain rule for events

Two events

,

where  denotes the conditional probability of  given .

Example

An Urn A has 1 black ball and 2 white balls and another Urn B has 1 black ball and 3 white balls. Suppose we pick an urn at random and then select a ball from that urn. Let event  be choosing the first urn, i.e. Let event  be the chance we choose a white ball. The chance of choosing a white ball, given that we have chosen the first urn, is  The intersection  then describes choosing the first urn and a white ball from it. The probability can be calculated by the chain rule as follows:

Finitely many events

For events  whose intersection has not probability zero, the chain rule states

Example 1
For , i.e. four events, the chain rule reads

.

Example 2 
We randomly draw 4 cards without replacement from deck of skat with 52 cards. What is the probability that we have picked 4 aces?

First, we set . Obviously, we get the following probabilities

.

Applying the chain rule,

.

Statement of the theorem and proof 

Let  be a probability space. Recall that the conditional probability of an  given  is defined as 

Then we have the following theorem.

Chain rule for discrete random variables

Two random variables

For two discrete random variables , we use the eventsand in the definition above, and find the joint distribution as

or 

Finitely many random variables

By the definition of the conditional probability,

and using the chain rule, where we set , we can find the joint distribution as

Example

For , i.e. considering three random variables. Then, the chain rule reads

See also

Bibliography

 
 
 , p. 496.

References

Bayesian inference
Bayesian statistics
Mathematical identities
Probability theory